Pemmasani Timmanayudu I, also known as Thimma Nayudu, was the progenitor of the Pemmasani Nayaks, as per the kaifiyat of Tadipatri. The Pemmasani migrated from Telugu regions to serve the Vijayanagara Empire militarily. 

Pemmasani Timmanayudu first entered into the service of the Vijayanagara Empire as the keeper of the royal pigeons. Praudha Devaraya (Devaraya II) sent Timmanayudu I to Yadiki, where Timmanayudu constructed a fort with four bastions. Moreover, Timmanayudu built one temple for Veerabhadra and one temple for Ganapati because their idols were found during the construction of the Yadiki Fort.

Pemmasani Timmanayudu I administered Yadiki and its adjoining territory for sometime. He died there and was succeeded by his son, Ramalinganayudu I.

See also 

 Devaraya II
 Pemmasani Nayaks
 Pemmasani Ramalinga Nayudu

Notes

Bibliography 
 
 
 

Year of birth missing
Indian generals
Telugu people
Telugu monarchs
Year of death unknown